Qaleh Pokhtuk (also Romanized as Qal‘eh Pokhtūk; also known as Bakhtak, Noşratābād, Qal‘a Pākhtuk, Qal‘eh Pākhtuk, and Qal‘eh-ye Pakhtūk ) is a village in Pain Velayat Rural District, Razaviyeh District, Mashhad County, Razavi Khorasan Province, Iran. At the 2006 census, its population was 175, in 36 families.

References 

Populated places in Mashhad County